Pervo-Devo is the second E.P. by punk rock band Screeching Weasel. It consists of songs that were recorded for My Brain Hurts but were left off the album. The E.P. was originally included with the final issue of "Teen Punks in Heat", a sex-themed 'zine penned by Ben Weasel.   There were two pressing of the record.  Between the two pressings, the record label changed its name from "Shred of Dignity" to "Outpunk".  All of the songs resurfaced on the band's B-sides album Kill the Musicians, though the spoken intro to "I Wanna Be A Homosexual" by Bruce LaBruce appears only on this 7".

Track listing
 "I Wanna Be a Homosexual" (Weasel/Jughead/Vapid) – 3:04
 "She's Giving Me the Creeps" (Weasel/Vapid) – 2:23
 "I Fall to Pieces" (H.Cochran/H. Howard) – 2:11

Personnel 
Ben Weasel - lead vocals
Jughead - guitar
Danny Vapid - guitar, backing vocals
Dave Naked - bass
Danny Panic - drums

1991 EPs
Screeching Weasel EPs